Gynoeryx integer is a moth of the family Sphingidae. It is known from Madagascar.

References

Gynoeryx
Moths described in 1956
Moths of Madagascar
Moths of Africa